Pieface may refer to:

 Pie Face, an Australian company that sells take-away pies, sandwiches, coffee, soft drinks and other snack products 
 Pie-Face, a friend to British comics character Dennis the Menace and Gnasher
 Thomas Kalmaku, sidekick to DC Comics character Hal Jordan, the superhero Green Lantern
 John McKenzie (ice hockey), professional ice hockey player
 PieFace Records, a fictional record label in British television comedy series The Mighty Boosh
 A slang term for the K-42 Reconnaissance Camera developed by the United States Air Force in the early 1950s

See also
Pieing